Don't Lie is a 1942 Our Gang short comedy film directed by Edward Cahn. It was the 205th Our Gang short (206th episode, 117th talking short, 118th talking episode, and 37th MGM produced episode) that was released.

Plot
Buckwheat's accurate report of a wandering monkey is ignored because of his past fibs, with resulting confusion.

Cast

The Gang
 Billie Thomas as Buckwheat
 Mickey Gubitosi as Mickey
 Billy Laughlin as Froggy
 George McFarland as Spanky

Additional cast
 Billy Curtis as Melinda, the chimp
 Emmett Vogan as Circus Official

See also
 Our Gang filmography

References

External links
 

1942 films
American black-and-white films
Films directed by Edward L. Cahn
Metro-Goldwyn-Mayer short films
Our Gang films
1942 comedy films
1942 short films
1940s American films